George Arthur Woodford (22 April 1915 – 21 April 1966) was an English professional footballer who played as a full back for Norwich City and Southampton in the 1930s.

Football career
Woodford was born at Lymington, but started his professional career at Norwich City. He had been spotted by Norwich City's scout in Hampshire, the former Southampton player, Jim Angell. He joined the Canaries as an amateur in October 1934, signing a professional contract in September 1935. He made his first-team debut on 4 April 1936 in a Second Division draw with Bradford City. After making ten league appearances for Norwich, Woodford followed manager Tom Parker to Second Division rivals Southampton in June 1937.

At The Dell, Woodford was used as cover for Charles Sillett and Arthur Roberts. He made his debut for the Saints at left back in a 3–1 victory against his former club, Norwich City, on New Year's Day 1938, when Roberts was injured. His next match was a fortnight later in a 3–0 defeat at Aston Villa, following which Roberts returned to the side. Woodford was "able to use both feet with equal facility" whose "outstanding traits (were) his industry and mobility".

Woodford returned to the side for four matches in April, but only played once more in the following season, after which he was released, joining his home-town club, Lymington.

References

External links
Career details on www.11v11.com

1915 births
1966 deaths
People from Lymington
English footballers
Norwich City F.C. players
Southampton F.C. players
Lymington Town F.C. players
English Football League players
Association football defenders